The greater guinea pig (Cavia magna) is a species of rodent found in the coastal strip of Brazil and Uruguay, where it lives in moist grassland and marshes.

Description
The dorsal fur is dark agouti brown and the underparts are reddish brown. It is semiaquatic and has membranes joining the toes.

Its karyotype has 2n = 64 and FN = 128.

Distribution and habitat
This species is native to the coastal strip of land in eastern Uruguay and southeastern Brazil. Its typical habitat is moist grassland, marshes, the edges of woodland and small valleys.

Behaviour
The greater guinea pig is a herbivore. It is a solitary animal and has a complex network of tunnels and runways through the vegetation. The home range is variable and seems to be related to the animal's size, its sex, and the water level in the area. Females seem capable of breeding at any time of year but births predominate in spring and the early part of summer. Females may have up to three litters in one year. The gestation period is about 64 days and the litter size is very small (1 or 2 pups). The young are quite large when born and grow fast, and some females born in the spring themselves breed successfully when between 30 and 45 days old.  This small mammal is unusual in that it produces a small number of precocial offspring with a high survival rate when it might have been expected to produce large litters of altricial young.

Status
The International Union for Conservation of Nature has rated the conservation status of the greater guinea pig as being of "least concern". It is believed to have a large total population, and although the population is thought to be slightly declining in Uruguay, this is not at a rate sufficiently significant for it to be listed in a more threatened category.

References

External links

Guinea pigs
Mammals of Brazil
Mammals of Uruguay
Rodents of South America
Environment of Rio Grande do Sul
Mammals described in 1980